Vishwa Mohan Kumar (born 22 January 1958) is an Indian politician. He was a member of the Indian Parliament, and represented Supaul (Lok Sabha constituency) in 15th Lok Sabha.

References

1958 births
Living people
India MPs 2009–2014
Lok Sabha members from Bihar
Janata Dal (United) politicians
Lok Janshakti Party politicians